The Islamic Socialist Party is a Sudanese political party, founded in 1949.

History
The party was founded in March 1949 under the name of Islamic Liberation Front حركة التحرير الاسلامي by Babiker Karrar, a student of law at the University of Khartoum. The party spread amongst University of Khartoum and secondary school students. It was a revivalist Islamic movement with a tendency of locality and nationality.

In 1951, the front's candidates won the elections to the leadership of the University of Khartoum Student Union (KUSU), as well as student unions at some secondary schools.

Following the 1953 agreement between Sudanese political parties for self-determination in Cairo, the front's name was changed to Gama'a Islamyia. The new organization published its constitution and manifesto expounding the main principles of the former Islamic Liberation Movement, which were anti-imperialist, anti-capitalist and socialist. The manifesto was titled "Al-Gama'a Al-Islamya Daw'a wa Minhag" (The Gama'a Islamyia: A call and a program). The movement directed its efforts towards the trade unions of workers, farmers, students and intellectuals in Sudan.

In 1956, after the tripartite invasion of Egypt by Britain, France and Israel, which led to wide Arab support for Egyptian President Gamal Abdel Nasser, the group developed an emphasis on Pan-Arabism and liberation under the name of the Islamic Socialist Party.

References

1949 establishments in Sudan
Anti-capitalist political parties
Arab nationalism in Sudan
Arab socialist political parties
Islamic political parties in Sudan
Islamic socialist political parties
Political parties established in 1949
Socialist parties in Sudan